Abdou Rahman Dampha (born 27 December 1991) is a Gambian professional footballer who plays as a midfielder for US Raon-l'Étape.

Career
Dampha began his career with Gambia Ports Authority F.C. and in 2007 was promoted to the first team of the Gambian Championnat National D1. In January 2009 he signed a professional contract with Algerian club Mouloudia Club Saïda. A year later, in January 2010, he transferred from Maloudia Club Saida to Swiss Super League team Neuchâtel Xamax, on a 4.5-year contract. He made his league debut for Neuchâtel Xamax on 6 February 2010 against FC Zürich.

On 14 May 2012, Dampha signed a two-year deal with French Ligue 1 side AS Nancy, until the summer of 2014.

International career
Dampha was member of the Gambia national under-17 football team and currently plays in the Gambia U-20 team. In December 2009 Dampha earned his first international cap for the Scorpions.

References

External links
 
 

1991 births
Living people
Sportspeople from Banjul
Gambian footballers
Association football midfielders
Gambia Ports Authority FC players
MC Saïda players
Neuchâtel Xamax FCS players
AS Nancy Lorraine players
US Raon-l'Étape players
The Gambia youth international footballers
The Gambia international footballers
Gambian expatriate footballers
Expatriate footballers in Algeria
Expatriate footballers in France
Expatriate footballers in Switzerland